David Vincent Samayoa (born ) is a Canadian male weightlifter, competing in the 94 kg category and representing Canada at international competitions. He has competed at world championships, including at the 2015 World Weightlifting Championships.

Major results

References

1992 births
Living people
Canadian male weightlifters
Place of birth missing (living people)
Weightlifters at the 2014 Commonwealth Games
Weightlifters at the 2015 Pan American Games
Commonwealth Games competitors for Canada
Pan American Games competitors for Canada
20th-century Canadian people
21st-century Canadian people